West Trout Brook is a river in Delaware County, New York. It flows into Trout Brook north-northeast of Shinhopple.

References

Rivers of New York (state)
Rivers of Delaware County, New York